Traitavad (त्रैतवाद) or Traita (त्रेत्) also known as Vedic Trinity, is a Hindu philosophy, in which Brahman (God), Jiva (soul) and Prakruti (matter/universe) are separate entities that exist eternally, unlike  Advaita. It has similarities with Dvaita and Visishtadvaita, the major difference being that God is impersonal in Traitavad, unlike these two schools.

It was propagated by Maharshi Dayanand Saraswati by stating references from Vedanta darshan and Brahmasutra. 

Both Pralaya (Dissolution) and Utpatti (origin) are never-ending cyclic processes carried out by Brahman (God), which are supported by the Dvaita and Advaita philosophies.

Notable Traitvad believers include Lala Lajpat Rai, yogi sri Arobindo and Indian Freedom Fighters.

Brahman, God 

In the Vedic Trinity, Dayanand states that the Brahman's basic name is om which is the collection of three words - (अ-उ-म) - in which every word denotes several qualities of God. Dayanand states that in the Vedic view, God is omnipresent and formless. God is responsible for giving us the fruits of our deeds, yet doesn't interfere in the working of Jiva (Soul)  directly. The Soul is said to be free to do as it wishes, but its deeds come under the Justice of Brahman.

Jiva, Soul 

Jiva is not omnipresent, whether in restriction (in body) or in free state (out of body). Jiva is free to do as it wishes within the capabilities of its limited knowledge and strength. Dayanand states that Jiva is neither male nor female and that the rest of the living world has the same soul as humans. Jiva takes birth on the basis of its deeds in different yonis of the living world.

Universe, Matter 

Dayanand explains that the God Brahman is the Nimita Karan of this universe and the latter (the universe or the matter) is denoted as Upadan Karan, which means that the visible universe exists in a non-visual form that is used by Brahman to create the (visible) universe. The first things (elements) created were Sat-Raj-Tam, which were in turn used to create all the rest. It is said that all of matter is a mixtures of these three elements. When these three elements are combined, the state of that matter is termed Mahat.

Unity of Darshanas and creation 

Condemning the famous view of contradiction between various Darshanas of Hindu Philosophy, he said that they are fools who see differences between Darshanas,

"In six Darshanas there is nothing lies or opposite to each other. All those who see difference between them are liars, because God is the reason of universe by creation that is Nimit Karana and Matter is the reason if this universe by being Upadan Karan being source of creation of the Universe. He says that contradiction is only when there is a different point of view on the same topic. In six Darshanas there is no contradiction or are opposite to each other and they are as follows."
Mimamsa- There is no creation in this universe which takes place without being created.
Vaisheshika- If time is not spent, nothing can be created.
Nyaya- Without having a source, nothing can happen.
Samkhya- Without mixing of matter, nothing can be created.
Vedanta- If there is no creator, nothing can be created.

The six reasons are explained in the six Darshanas separately, which is why there is no contradiction or opposition between them. In the same way that six men are needed to put a roof on a wall, the six philosophers completed the task of explaining the six reasons of the creation of the universe.

See also 
Dayananda Saraswati
Satyarth Prakash
Arya Samaj
Rigvedadi Bhashya Bhumika
Lala Lajpat Rai

References 

Arya Samaj
Hindu philosophical concepts